The Ibero-American Cultural Centre is a cultural and educational institution founded on 21 May 2019 and developed with the support of the Russian Ministry of Culture and Ibero-American embassies, with the aim of promoting Ibero-American culture and languages. The center is part of Margarita Rudomino All-Russia State Library for Foreign Literature and has its own books fond, consisting in books in Spanish, Portuguese, Catalan, Galician and Russian.

Activities 

 Provide access to literature in Spanish and Portuguese, including electronic resources and scientific bases;

 Serve readers in the library and remotely;

 Organize and provide various cultural activities in offline and online format;

 Participation in forums, conferences and other activities.

Activity formats 

 Conversation clubs
 Open classes and webinars
 Expositions
 Book presentations
 Projections
 Lessons
 Round tables
 Poetic evenings
 Meetings with native speakers
 National holidays and festivals

References

External links 

 

Cultural centers